Jean-Baptiste Terrien (born at St-Laurent-des-Autels, Maine-et-Loire, 26 August 1832; d. at Bellevue, near Paris, 5 December 1903) was a French Jesuit dogmatic theologian.

Life

He entered the Society of Jesus at Angers, 7 December 1854; he then taught philosophy for two years and dogmatic theology for twenty-two at the seminaries of Laval (France), 1864–80, and Saint Helier (Jersey), 1880–88. After being spiritual father at Laval, he was appointed professor of dogmatic theology and taught three years, 1891–94, at the Catholic Institute of Paris, remaining afterwards in this city as spiritual father and writer.

Works

During his first period of teaching, he did not publish any theological work, except a treatise, "De Verbo incarnato", Jersey, 1882, for private circulation; there are also five or six other treatises in manuscript or lithographed, which form a substantial body of Positive rather than Scholastic theology, after the manner and doctrine of Cardinal Franzelin.

In a quite different style is framed a neo-Thomistic monograph, published at Paris in 1894: "S. Thomæ Aquinatis, O.P., doctrina sincera de unione hypostatica Verbi Dei cum humanitate amplissime declarata". At this time, Terrien began to write more popular works, and published the following doctrinal treatises in French:

"La Dévotion au Sacré-Coeur de Jésus, d'après les documents authentiques et la théologie", 1893; Italian translation by G. M. Rossi (Naples, 1895);
"La grâce et la gloire ou la filiation adoptive des enfants de Dieu étudiée dans sa réalité, ses principes, son perfectionnement, et son couronnement final", 2 vols., 1897; new ed., 1908;
"La Mère de Dieu et la Mère des hommes d'après les Pères et la théologie", 4 vols., 1900, 1902.

References

Attribution

1832 births
1903 deaths
Jesuit theologians
19th-century French Jesuits
19th-century French Catholic theologians